Jilted is a 1987 film directed by Bill Bennett.

Plot
Two people who have had disastrous love affairs meet on a tropical island resort.

Cast
 Richard Moir as Al
 Jennifer Cluff as Harry
 Steve Jacobs as Bob
 Helen Mutkins as Cindy
 Tina Bursill as Paula
 Ken Radley as Doug

Production
The script was inspired by the breakup of Bennett's first marriage. Half the budget was raised by a pre-sale to J.C. Williamson and the movie was shot on Fraser Island in February 1987, near Orchid Beach Resort.

Release
The film was not released theatrically, despite Tina Burstill winning an AFI Award for Best Supporting Actress. It was released on video in 1989.

Bill Bennett later said he feels the film was not as effective as it could have been, and together with the lack of success of Dear Cardholder led to him taking a break from making features for a number of years.

References

External links

1987 films
Australian drama films
Films directed by Bill Bennett
1980s English-language films
1980s Australian films